Raymond George Smith (born 7 March 1936) is a retired Australian Anglican bishop. He served as an assistant bishop in the Anglican Diocese of Sydney, as the first Bishop of South Western Sydney (then called the "Bishop of Liverpool") from 1 November 1993 to 31 December 2001.

Smith was educated at the Australian College of Theology and ordained in 1959. He served as priest in the Diocese of Armidale from 1959 to 1986, ministering to the parishes of Barraba, Moree, Ashford and Uralla and during that time was collated as archdeacon within the diocese. He was then the  Director of Extension Ministries at Trinity Episcopal School for Ministry in Ambridge, Pennsylvania in the United States until 1990 when he returned to Australia to be the Archdeacon of South Canberra and Rector of Wanniassa the Diocese of Canberra and Goulburn, his last positions before being ordained to the episcopate.

Following his retirement as an assistant bishop, Smith worked as an assistant minister at St Philip's Church, Sydney until 2019.

Smith is married to Shirley and has three children.

References

Anglican archdeacons in Australia
20th-century Anglican bishops in Australia
21st-century Anglican bishops in Australia
Assistant bishops in the Anglican Diocese of Sydney
Evangelical Anglican bishops
Living people

1936 births